The women's 800 metres event at the 1999 European Athletics U23 Championships was held in Göteborg, Sweden, at Ullevi on 30 July and 1 August 1999.

Medalists

Results

Final
1 August

Heats
30 July
Qualified: first 2 in each heat and 2 best to the Final

Heat 1

Heat 2

Heat 3

Participation
According to an unofficial count, 16 athletes from 12 countries participated in the event.

 (1)
 (1)
 (1)
 (2)
 (1)
 (1)
 (1)
 (2)
 (2)
 (2)
 (1)
 (1)

References

800 metres
800 metres at the European Athletics U23 Championships